Chandauli Majhwar railway station is on the Delhi–Howrah line. It is located in Chandauli district in the Indian state of Uttar Pradesh. It serves Chandauli and the surrounding areas. Its name chandauli Majhwar is derived from the district name Chandauli and a very famous nearby village named Majhwar Khas.

History
The East Indian Railway Company started connecting Delhi and Howrah from the mid nineteenth century. In 1862, the railway tracks crossed Mughalsarai and reached the western bank of the Yamuna. The through link to Delhi was established in 1866. The Grand Chord was commissioned in 1906.

Electrification
The Mughalsarai–Howrah sector was electrified in 1961–63.

References

External links
 Trains at Chandauli Majhwar

Railway stations in Chandauli district
Mughalsarai railway division
1906 establishments in India
Chandauli